From 1 January 2011, in accordance with the Kallikratis plan, the administrative system of Greece was drastically overhauled. For the current list, see List of municipalities of Greece (2011). This is an alphabetical list of municipalities and communities in Greece from 1997 to 2010, under the Kapodistrias Plan.

For an ordered list of cities with population over 10,000 see List of cities in Greece.

See also

List of settlements in Achaea
List of settlements in Aetolia-Acarnania
List of settlements in Arcadia
List of settlements in Argolis
List of settlements in the Arta regional unit
List of settlements in Attica
List of settlements in Boeotia
List of settlements in Cephalonia
List of settlements in Chalkidiki
List of settlements in the Chania regional unit
List of settlements in the Chios regional unit
List of settlements in the Corfu regional unit
List of settlements in Corinthia
List of settlements in the Cyclades
List of settlements in the Dodecanese
List of settlements in the Drama regional unit
List of settlements in Elis
List of settlements in the Euboea regional unit
List of settlements in the Evros regional unit
List of settlements in Evrytania
List of settlements in the Florina regional unit
List of settlements in the Grevena regional unit
List of settlements in the Heraklion regional unit
List of settlements in the Ikaria regional unit
List of settlements in Imathia
List of settlements in the Ioannina regional unit
List of settlements in the Karditsa regional unit
List of settlements in the Kastoria regional unit
List of settlements in the Kavala regional unit
List of settlements in the Kilkis regional unit
List of settlements in the Kozani regional unit
List of settlements in Laconia
List of settlements in the Larissa regional unit
List of settlements in Lasithi
List of settlements in the Lefkada regional unit
List of settlements in the Lemnos regional unit
List of settlements in Lesbos
List of settlements in the Magnesia regional unit
List of settlements in Messenia
List of settlements in the Pella regional unit
List of settlements in Phocis
List of settlements in Phthiotis
List of settlements in the Pieria regional unit
List of settlements in the Preveza regional unit
List of settlements in the Rethymno regional unit
List of settlements in the Rhodope regional unit
List of settlements in Samos
List of settlements in the Serres regional unit
List of settlements in Thesprotia
List of settlements in the Thessaloniki regional unit
List of settlements in the Trikala regional unit
List of settlements in the Xanthi regional unit
List of settlements in Zakynthos

Population data from: National Statistical Service of Greece

 
 List